, is a micro-asteroid, classified as near-Earth object belonging to the Apollo group. It was first observed by Spacewatch at Kitt Peak National Observatory on 25 April 2004.

Description 

 and was visible between 25 April 25 to 10 May 2005. This find was documented as part of the FMO Project and was reported by six different observatories. Reports indicate that the object is about 74 meters wide and has an absolute magnitude of 23.28. The object could also be classified as a meteoroid, although the most common definition uses a diameter of 10 m as the demarcation.

It orbits the Sun at a distance of 0.9–2.2 AU once every 23 months (708 days). Its orbit has an eccentricity of 0.44 and an inclination of 6° with respect to the ecliptic.

References

External links 
 MPEC 2004-H82 : 2004 HR56, Minor Planet Electronic Circular , 28 April 2004
  at NEODys-2
 Holmann Transfer Daily, News from 2 May 2004
 
 
 

Minor planet object articles (unnumbered)
20040425